The 2023 Pinatar Cup was the third edition of the Pinatar Cup, an international women's football tournament. It was held in San Pedro del Pinatar, Spain from 15 to 21 February 2023.

Iceland won the tournament for the first time.

Format
The four invited teams played a round-robin tournament. Points awarded in the group stage followed the formula of three points for a win, one point for a draw, and zero points for a loss. A tie in points was decided by goal differential.

Venue

Teams

Squads

Standings

Results
All times are local (UTC+1).

Goalscorers

References

2023 Pinatar Cup
2022–23 in Spanish women's football
2023 in women's association football
Pinatar Cup
February 2023 sports events in Spain